Fear is a 2023 American horror film directed by Deon Taylor and starring Joseph Sikora, Andrew Bachelor, Annie Ilonzeh, Ruby Modine, Iddo Goldberg, Terrence Jenkins, Jessica Allain, and Tip "T.I." Harris.

The film was released in the United States on January 27, 2023.

Plot

Cast
 Joseph Sikora as Rom
 Andrew Bachelor as Benny
 Annie Ilonzeh as Bianca  
 Iddo Goldberg as Michael
 Ruby Modine as Serena
 Jessica Allain as Meg 
 Terrence Jenkins as Russ
 Tip "T.I." Harris as Lou

Production
The film, originally titled Don't Fear, was shot in 17 days in Kyburz, California, during the COVID-19 pandemic in August 2020.

The film's score was composed by Geoff Zanelli, who scored several of Taylor's previous films.

Release
In August 2021, it was reported that the film had been retitled Fear, and was originally set to be released on Valentine's Day weekend in 2022, as the first release of Hidden Empire Film Group's new distribution company, Hidden Empire Releasing. The film was released in the United States on January 27, 2023.

Reception 
On Rotten Tomatoes, the film holds an approval rating of 22% based on 18 reviews, with an average rating of 3.8/10.

References

External links
 
 

2023 horror films
2023 films
2020s psychological horror films
2020s American films
2020s English-language films
American psychological horror films
Films directed by Deon Taylor
Films impacted by the COVID-19 pandemic
Films scored by Geoff Zanelli
Films shot in California